The 2022 Nonthaburi Challenger II was a professional tennis tournament played on hard courts. It was the 2nd edition of the tournament which was part of the 2022 ATP Challenger Tour. It took place in Nonthaburi, Thailand from 29 August to 4 September 2022.

Singles main-draw entrants

Seeds

 1 Rankings are as of 22 August 2022.

Other entrants
The following players received wildcards into the singles main draw:
  Thanapet Chanta
  Krittin Koaykul
  Kasidit Samrej

The following player received entry into the singles main draw as a special exempt:
  Valentin Vacherot

The following player received entry into the singles main draw as an alternate:
  Omar Jasika

The following players received entry from the qualifying draw:
  Charles Broom
  Arthur Cazaux
  Chung Yun-seong
  Ben Patael
  Tristan Schoolkate
  Beibit Zhukayev

The following players received entry as lucky losers:
  Daniel Cukierman
  James McCabe
  Yuta Shimizu

Champions

Singles

 Arthur Cazaux def.  Omar Jasika 7–6(8–6), 6–4.

Doubles

 Benjamin Lock /  Yuta Shimizu def.  Francis Alcantara /  Christopher Rungkat 6–1, 6–3.

References

2022 in Thai sport
2022 ATP Challenger Tour
August 2022 sports events in Thailand